Jesse Leech Davisson (1860-1940) was an American suffragist active in Ohio. She was a member of the Advisory Council of the Congressional Union for Woman Suffrage.

Life
Davisson née Leech was born on February 5, 1860, in Sewickley, Pennsylvania. In 1899 she married the attorney Oscar F. Davisson (1851-1932) with whom she had three children.

In 1896 Davisson joined the Jonathan Dayton chapter of the Daughters of the American Revolution. By 1912 Davisson became involved with advocating for women's suffrage when she campaigned for suffrage for Ohio women. She went on to become president of the Woman Suffrage Party of Montgomery County, Ohio. She also served on the Executive Committee of the Ohio State Woman Suffrage Association, and the Advisory Council of the Congressional Union for Woman Suffrage. In 1914 Davidson helped organize Dayton, Ohio's the first Woman's Suffrage Parade. Her efforts to win women's suffrage on the state level failed, and the women of Ohio did not receive the vote until the passage of the Nineteenth Amendment.

In 1921 Davisson help found the Dayton and Montgomery County League of Women Voters and served as its first vice president.

Davisson died on June 29, 1940.

See also
 List of suffragists and suffragettes

References

External links
 

1860 births
1940 deaths
American suffragists